Christian Viet (born 27 March 1999) is a German professional footballer who plays as a defender or winger for Jahn Regensburg.

Career
Viet made his professional debut for FC St. Pauli in the 2. Bundesliga on 5 June 2020, starting in the away match against VfL Bochum.

References

External links
 
 
 
 

1999 births
Living people
German footballers
Association football defenders
Association football wingers
FC St. Pauli II players
FC St. Pauli players
Borussia Dortmund II players
SSV Jahn Regensburg players
2. Bundesliga players
3. Liga players
Regionalliga players